Events from the year 1750 in Russia

Incumbents
 Monarch – Elizabeth I

Events

Births

 
 
 January 16 – Ivan Trubetskoy, Russian field marshal (b. 1667)

Deaths

 
 
 
 Vasily Tatishchev

References

1750 in Russia
Years of the 18th century in the Russian Empire